Ida Holz Bard (born 30 January 1935) is a Uruguayan engineer, computer scientist, professor, and researcher, known as a pioneer in the field of computing and the Internet.

Biography
Coming from a Jewish family of Polish origin, from age 18 to 22 Ida Holz went to Israel, where she was in the army and on a kibbutz.

There, her professor of mathematical logic invited her to attend a course offered by the University of the Republic in the computation field.

In 1964 she married the artist Anhelo Hernández, dedicated to contemporary painting, and who joined the Torres García Workshop. In 1976 they went into exile in Mexico. During this period, Holz worked in the General Directorate of Economic and Social Policy. Later she worked at that country's National Institute of Statistics. The Mexican government came to offer her the directorship, but she had already decided to return to Uruguay.

In 1986 she competed for the directorship of the Central Information Service of the University of the Republic (SECIU) and was successful. From this position, Ida Holz led the development of the Internet in Uruguay beginning in the early 1990s. Since then, she has played a prominent role in the development and evolution of information and communications technology in Uruguay. She was also one of the promoters of the Ceibal project.

Holz is recognized for having opposed a conference in Rio de Janeiro in 1991, at which the United States and Europe imposed their authorities at the Latin American level on the nascent global network.

Under her direction, in 1994 SECIU installed the first Internet node in Uruguay.

Awards and honors
Ida Holz received the 2009 Lifetime Achievement Award, granted by the Latin America and Caribbean Network Information Centre (LACNIC) to people who have contributed to the permanent development of the Internet.

In 2013 she was the first Latin American personality (male or female) to enter the Internet Society's Hall of Fame, an initiative that honors people who have been important to the development and strengthening of the Internet.

The  awarded her its 2014 Girdle of Honor at public school No. 4 José Artigas, where the engineer completed her primary studies.

The National Postal Administration issued stamps in 2015 of the series "Outstanding Personalities of Uruguay" dedicated to Ida Holz.

In 2017, Holz received a recognition in honor of her career as an Internet pioneer in Uruguay, in the framework of the Ceibal project's tenth anniversary celebration.

One of the so-called "fathers of the Internet", Vint Cerf, when asked if there was a "mother of the Internet", responded:

References

1935 births
20th-century Uruguayan educators
20th-century women engineers
21st-century Uruguayan educators
21st-century engineers
21st-century women engineers
Living people
People from Montevideo
University of the Republic (Uruguay) alumni
Academic staff of the University of the Republic (Uruguay)
Uruguayan computer scientists
Uruguayan educators
20th-century Uruguayan engineers
Uruguayan Jews
Uruguayan people of Polish-Jewish descent
Uruguayan women educators
Women civil servants
Uruguayan women computer scientists